The 169th Aviation Regiment is an aviation regiment of the U.S. Army.

Structure
 1st Battalion (General Support), 169th Aviation Regiment (CT ARNG), Enfield Armory, Enfield, Connecticut
 Headquarters and Headquarters Company
 Detachment 1 (AL ARNG), Birmingham Air National Guard Base, Birmingham, Alabama
 Detachment 2 (GA ARNG), Army Aviation Support Facility #3, Hunter Army Airfield
 Company A (USAR), Simmons Army Airfield, Fort Bragg, Fayetteville, North Carolina
 Company B (AL ARNG), Birmingham Air National Guard Base, Birmingham, Alabama 
 Detachment 1 (GA ARNG), Army Aviation Support Facility #3, Hunter Army Airfield
 Detachment 2 (GA ARNG), Army Aviation Support Facility #3, Hunter Army Airfield
 Company C (MD ARNG), Edward J. Weide Army Heliport, Aberdeen Proving Ground Edgewood Area, Edgewood, Maryland 
 Detachment 1 (OK ARNG), Army Aviation Support Facility #1, Lexington, Oklahoma 
 Detachment 2 (GA ARNG), Army Aviation Support Facility #3, Hunter Army Airfield
 Company D (CT ARNG), Windsor Locks, Connecticut
 Detachment 2 (GA ARNG), Army Aviation Support Facility #3, Hunter Army Airfield
 Detachment 4 (PA ARNG), Johnstown Military Aviation Complex, Johnstown, Pennsylvania 
 Detachment 8 (AL ARNG), Birmingham Air National Guard Base, Birmingham, Alabama 
 Detachment 9 (GA ARNG), Army Aviation Support Facility #3, Hunter Army Airfield
 Company E (CT ARNG), Windsor Locks, Connecticut 
 Detachment 2 (GA ARNG), Army Aviation Support Facility #3, Hunter Army Airfield
 Detachment 4 (PA ARNG), Johnstown Military Aviation Complex, Johnstown, Pennsylvania 
 Detachment 8 (AL ARNG), Birmingham Air National Guard Base, Birmingham, Alabama 
 Company F (NY ARNG), Aviation Support Facility #2, Rochester Armory, Rochester, New York 
 Detachment 1 (LA ARNG), Aviation Support Facility #1, Air Traffic Services, Northshore Regional Airport, Hammond, Louisiana
 Detachment 3 (MO ARNG), Springfield Aviation Classification Repair Activity Depot, Springfield, Missouri

References

169